G. M. Kumar is an Indian actor who has appeared in Tamil language films. He won Nandi Award for Second Best Story Writer film Muvva Gopaludu (1987) its an official remake of his own film Aruvadai Naal

Personal life
GM kumar was born in 1957 in Avadi.As a child he got the chance to view many films.Soon he moved to film industry as assistant director to K. Bhagyaraj.He had worked with Livingston and R.P.Vishwam for movies like Kakki Sattai, Kanni Rasi.

Career
Kumar debuted in films by directing Sivaji Productions' Aruvadai Naal (1986) with Prabhu in the lead role. The film won good reviews and fetched Kumar several offers to make more films, though he noted that he rejected several as the producers were unwilling to have Ilaiyaraaja as composer. His next two directorial venture Pickpocket and Uruvam were disasters. The film Irumbu Pookal's music did well as two songs were composed by M.S.Viswanathan, however the film failed at the box office. Due to his insistence that he will direct only if music is by Ilaiyaraaja, he lost films. Thus his market value significantly diminished and only went to make three more films despite his initial success. His decision to produce and direct Uruvam became a financial failure and put him into bankruptcy. He ended up making his acting debut as a villain in Bharathiraja's Captain Magal (1992), before disappearing to make documentaries and to study anthropology. In the early 2000s, he was once again on the verge of bankruptcy and chose to act in minor roles offered by his protege Raj Kapoor, in films including Ramchandra and the unreleased Sivalingam IPS. He expressed his surprise at being given an offer by Shankar's production house and took up the role in Veyil (2006) to make ends meet, winning acclaim for his role.

Bala approached him to star in Avan Ivan as a character called Highness, with his performance winning him a nomination for the Vijay Award for Best Supporting Actor. Critics labelled his performance as "riveting", though the film only won average reviews.

Filmography

Acting credits

Directing credits

Writer

Television
 Devathayai Kanden (2017) as Vasudevan's grandfather
 Poove Unakkaga (2020) as Shankaralingam
 Sembaruthi (2021) as Aadhikadavur" Aadhi Parameswaran

Web series

References

External links
G. M. Kumar on Facebook
G. M. Kumar on Twitter

Indian male film actors
Tamil male actors
Living people
Tamil film directors
1957 births
Male actors from Chennai
Male actors in Tamil cinema
20th-century Indian male actors
21st-century Indian male actors
20th-century Indian film directors
Tamil screenwriters
Screenwriters from Tamil Nadu
Indian male television actors